Bowkett v Action Finance Ltd [1992] 1 NZLR 449 is a cited case in New Zealand regarding unconscionable bargains.

Background
The Bowketts, an elderly couple, under pressure from their son Michael, agreed to use their house as security for a loan for their son with Action Finance. The Bowketts did not seek independent legal advice, but Action Finance's legal executive advised them to do so, as well as explaining the nature of the transaction.

When the son later defaulted on the loan, Action Finance sought to foreclose on the Bowketts' house.  The Bowketts obtained an interim injunction to stop the sale, pleading unconscionable bargain.

Action Finance appealed to have the injunction lifted.

Held
The court refused to lift the injunction, as the Bowketts were under a special disability when they entered into the transaction.

References

High Court of New Zealand cases
New Zealand contract case law
1991 in New Zealand law
1991 in case law